Bloom Wind is a 178 Megawatt wind farm in the American state of Kansas. The farm is situated on 15,000 acres of privately owned land near Dodge City.

See also 

Wind power in Kansas
Wind power in the United States

References

External links 

Wind farms in Kansas